was a  after Eiroku and before Tenshō. This period spanned from April 1570 through July 1573.

Change of era
 ; 1570: The era name was changed because of various wars. The previous era ended and a new one commenced in Eiroku 13, on the 23rd day of the 4th month.

Events of the Genki era
 1570 (Genki 1, 6th month): The combined forces of the Azai clan, led by Azai Nagamasa, and the Asakura clan, led by Asakura Yoshikage, met the forces of Oda Nobunaga in a shallow riverbed which has come to be known as the Battle of Anegawa. Tokugawa Ieyasu led forces which came to the aid of Oda's army; and Oda claimed the victory.
 1571 (Genki 2, 9th month): Nobunaga marched into Ōmi Province at the head of his army which surrounded Mt. Hiei. He massacred the priests and everyone else associated with the mountain temples; and then he gave orders that every structure on the mountain should be burned.
 1572 (Genki 3, 12th month): Takeda Shingen, the daimyō of Kai Province, led his army into Tōtōmi Province  where he engaged the forces of Tokugawa Ieyasu at the Battle of Mikatagahara.
 1573 (Genki 4, 2nd month): Ashikaga Yoshiaki began to fortify Nijō Castle; and he sent messages to Azai Nagamasa, Asakura Yoshikage, and Takeda Shingen, announcing his intention to engage Nobunaga. Six months later, the confrontation would end with Yoshiaki driven out of Kyoto and the Ashikaga shogunate de facto dismantled.

Notes

References
 Hall, John Whitney, Keiji Nagahara, Kozo Yamamura and Kōzō Yamamura (1981).  Japan Before Tokugawa: Political Consolidation and Economic Growth, 1500–1650. Princeton: Princeton University Press. 
 Nussbaum, Louis Frédéric and Käthe Roth. (2005). Japan Encyclopedia. Cambridge: Harvard University Press. ; OCLC 48943301
 Titsingh, Isaac. (1834). Nihon Ōdai Ichiran; ou,  Annales des empereurs du Japon.  Paris: Royal Asiatic Society, Oriental Translation Fund of Great Britain and Ireland. OCLC 5850691
 Totman, Conrad. (2000).  A History of Japan. Oxford: Blackwell Publishing.

External links
 National Diet Library, "The Japanese Calendar" -- historical overview plus illustrative images from library's collection

Japanese eras
1570s in Japan